Gazin (also Romanized as Gazīn) is a village in Abtar Rural District, in the Central District of Iranshahr County, Sistan and Baluchestan Province, Iran. At the 2006 census, its population was 15, in 5 families.

References 

Populated places in Iranshahr County